Robat-e Sar Push (also Romanized as Robāţ-e Sar Pūsh; also known as Robāţ-e Sar Pūshīdeh and Robāţī-ye Shāzdeh) is a village in Robat Rural District, in the Central District of Sabzevar County, Razavi Khorasan Province, Iran. At the 2006 census, its population was 1,111, in 297 families.

References 

Populated places in Sabzevar County